Alan Warren may refer to:

 Alan Warren (sailor) (born 1935), British sailor
 Alan Warren (priest) (1932-2020), Anglican priest and author
 Alan Warren (philatelist), American philatelist

See also
 Allan Warren (born 1948), English society-photographer, writer and former actor
 Allen Warren (1931–1974), Australian rules footballer